opened in Ashikaga, Tochigi Prefecture, Japan, in 1975. Specializing in Imari ware and Nabeshima ware, the collection includes the Important Cultural Property "Large Nabeshima Plate with Rock and Peony Design".

See also
List of museums in Tochigi prefecture
 Ashikaga Gakkō
 Banna-ji

References

External links

 Nakagawa-machi Batō Hiroshige Museum of Art

Museums in Tochigi Prefecture
Ceramics museums in Japan
Ashikaga, Tochigi
Art museums established in 1975
1975 establishments in Japan